This is a list of noted Ugandan poets, poets born or raised in Uganda, whether living there or overseas, and writing in one of the Languages of Uganda.

A-C
Grace Akello
Monica Arac de Nyeko
Austin Bukenya
Mildred Barya
Harriet Anena
Lillian Aujo
Busingye Kabumba

D-J
 Jessica Horn

K-L
Kabubi Herman
Kagayi Peter
Mary Karooro Okurut
Lubwa p'Chong

M-N
Mukotani Rugyendo
Mulumba Ivan Matthias
Christopher Henry Muwanga Barlow
Philippa Namutebi Kabali-Kagwa
Richard Carl Ntiru
John Nagenda
Nakisanze Segawa
Susan Nalugwa Kiguli
Beverley Nambozo
Elvania Namukwaya Zirimu
Jennifer Nansubuga Makumbi
Jason Ntaro

O
Julius Ocwinyo
James Munange Ogoola
Okello Oculi
Okot p'Bitek
Bernard Gabriel Okurut

P-S
Ife Piankhi
Rajat Neogy
David Rubadiri
John Ruganda
Eneriko Seruma

T-Z
Taban Lo Liyong
 Nick Twinamatsiko
Hilda Twongyeirwe
Timothy Wangusa
Ayeta Anne Wangusa
Samuel Iga Zinunula
Winnie Nantongo

See also

 List of poets
 List of Ugandan writers

Poets
Ugandan